Alain Roby is an American pastry chef. He is the holder of three Guinness World Records. He is also the owner  All Chocolate Kitchen, a chocolate and pastry shop located in Geneva, Illinois.

Biography 

Roby learned his culinary expertise in Paris, working with Pastry Chef Lenotre. Chef Alain Roby is a Certified Master Chef of Pastry and Sugar Artistry and is internationally known for his life-size chocolate and sugar sculptures. Chef Roby worked as the Corporate Executive Pastry Chef for Hyatt Regency Chicago for 24 years, before opening All Chocolate Kitchen on July 30, 2011.

Achievements

He is a permanent committee member of the Societe D’Escofier Chicago
He served as Private Pastry Chef to Shah of Iran, while also working in various cities like London, New York, Tokyo, and Chicago.
He is a Hall of Fame member in both “Pastry Art & Design” and “Chocolatier” magazines
His life-sized chocolate and sugar sculptures have been featured on the Food Network and The Learning Channel  and one for the "World's Longest Candy Cane." 
He is the only Pastry Chef to have won three Guinness World Records: one for the “World's Tallest Cooked Sugar Building”, one for the “World's Tallest Chocolate Sculpture,”  and one for the "World's Longest Candy Cane."
 He served as a celebrity chef during the Celebrity Chef Tour in Chicago and has been the head pastry chef at the NFL Commissioner's Super Bowl Party for the past 19 years.
 He has won over twenty culinary awards throughout his career 
Served as the Senior Corporate Pastry Chef for Hyatt Hotels, being in charge of the Pastry Division for all Hyatt Hotels and Resorts.

References 

Chefs from Illinois
Pastry chefs
Living people
American Culinary Federation Certified Master Chefs
Year of birth missing (living people)
Guinness World Records
People from Geneva, Illinois
Businesspeople from Illinois